Fujiwara no Tashi (藤原多子; 1140 – January 12, 1202) was an empress consort of Japan. She was first the consort of Emperor Konoe, and then of Emperor Nijō. Because she became consort twice, she was called the "Empress of Two Generations." Her birth father was Tokudaiji Kin'yoshi. Her adoptive father was Fujiwara no Yorinaga.

She had several other names in her lifetime, these being Fujiwara no Ōiko, Fujiwara no Masuko and Fujiwara no Tadako.

Life
Fujiwara no Yorinaga married Tokudaiji Kin'yoshi's eldest sister, Sachiko (Tashi's aunt), and raised Tashi as his daughter from a young age.

She was married to Emperor Konoe in 1150. After the Emperor's death in 1155, Tashi left the palace to live in seclusion.

In 1160, at the age of 21, she was called back to the palace by Emperor Nijō and became his empress. She is the only Japanese empress to have become one twice, and became the last known  of Japan.

When Emperor Nijō died in 1165, Tashi renounced the world to become a Buddhist priest. She became well known for her writing, art, and musical abilities. She died at the age of 62.

Notes

Fujiwara clan
Japanese empresses
Tokudaiji family
Japanese Buddhist nuns
12th-century Buddhists
1140 births
1202 deaths
Remarried royal consorts